Porlock Hill is a road west of Porlock, Somerset. It is part of the A39, connecting Porlock to Lynmouth and Barnstaple in Devon and is the steepest A-road in the United Kingdom, approaching 1 in 4 (13.7%) in places. A parallel toll road is available which travels the same route at an easier gradient.

Route
The route climbs west of Porlock to the north fringes of Exmoor. It climbs  in just under , the steepest gradient on any A-road in the UK. At one point, there is a warning sign advising motorists of a gradient of 1 in 4 (25%).

The road is part of the A39, a long-distance road across the north coast of Somerset and Cornwall, though it is not a main through route here. Porlock Hill is not recommended for caravans or HGVs, which are strongly advised to seek another route. Cyclists are advised to dismount. The road has two escape lanes along its descent, to handle runaway vehicles.

Owing to its gradient, numerous accidents have occurred on Porlock Hill. The village's local museum has an archive of photographs documenting various incidents along it.

In Porlock itself, burning brakes of vehicles that have just descended the hill can often be smelled.

History

There was no practical transport west of Porlock in the 18th century. In 1794, the poet Robert Southey wrote that such a route was considered "the end of the world". In 1812, the local community was fined for not maintaining a good road, and builders were employed to construct a suitable route. The road opened in 1843 when a stagecoach travelled from Lynton to Porlock successfully.

Shortly after the road opened, a local landowner, Mr Blathwayt, decided to build a toll road further west at a more relaxed gradient of 1 in 14 (7%). The toll road was not successful initially as horse-pulled traffic could cope with Porlock Hill, but became popular owing to the increased popularity of the motor car.

In 1899, a ten-ton lifeboat was launched from a storm in Lynmouth, but could not be put out to sea due to bad weather. Instead, it was hauled east by land, down Porlock Hill to the weir at Porlock, where it could be launched safely.

In 1900, a rally driver became the first person to drive a motor car up Porlock Hill, winning a £50 bet in the process. The first motor coach managed to climb the hill successfully in 1916.

Events
Porlock Hill is popular with cyclists. In 2015, over a hundred racers competed for a £3,100 prize to cycle up the hill along the toll road, followed by a series of children's races and a general fun ride. It is listed as one of the 100 greatest cycling climbs in the UK.

See also
Dunkery Beacon, a nearby hill that is the highest point in Exmoor and Somerset
Gold Hill, Shaftesbury - another famous hill in the South West

References
Citations

Sources

External links
Porlock Hill Climb – cycle race website
Video of a 1950s bus climbing Porlock Hill

Roads in Somerset
Hills of Somerset